The Mayor of Otaki officiated over the Otaki Borough of New Zealand, which was administered by the Otaki Borough Council. The office existed from 1921 until 1989, when Otaki Borough and was amalgamated into the new Kapiti Coast District Council as part of the 1989 local government reforms. There were 10 holders of the office.

List of mayors

Mayors of Otaki were:

References

Otaki
Mayors of places in Manawatū-Whanganui
Ōtaki, New Zealand